The 1873 Waterford County by-election was fought on 5 July 1873.  The byelection was fought due to the resignation of the incumbent Liberal MP, Edmond de la Poer.  It was won by the unopposed Liberal candidate Henry Villiers-Stuart.

References

1873 elections in the United Kingdom
By-elections to the Parliament of the United Kingdom in County Waterford constituencies
Unopposed by-elections to the Parliament of the United Kingdom (need citation)
1873 elections in Ireland